Hawthorne Math and Science Academy is a state charter high school in Hawthorne, California, USA. It is part of the Hawthorne School District. Esau Berumen is the Principal.

History
In 2003, the Hawthorne School District approved the creation of a new charter high school within their elementary school district. With students from the Hawthorne area, the school population at the school’s inception was 130 ninth-grade students. The original school site was Jefferson Elementary School, a school that was in the process of being remodeled. Under the tutelage of Pete Zahut, the principal, the first year focused on creating a new and rigorous college-preparatory school high school. In this first year, too, a student compact was established; the school theme—high expectations—emerged; a school newspaper, Aviator Update, was created; and the school colors, blue and white, were selected.

In 2004, students and faculty saw the second phase of the HMSA school development – a second move for the school. The old Hawthorne Masonic Temple, located at Broadway and Grevillea, was revamped and refurbished into the beginnings of a permanent school site. In 2007, an additional building was placed on the space previously occupied by the parking lot to accommodate the ever-growing student population.

The diversity and number of students at HMSA has grown since its founding. The school today has a dozen or so different ethnicities and a population of over 450, with room to expand to 600. Students travel to HMSA from not only the city of Hawthorne, but from neighboring cities as well, with some using the metro train as transportation to and from school.

Rankings
 U.S. News Best High Schools 2015: National Rank: #103
 U.S. News Best High Schools 2015: State Rank: #12
 U.S. News Best High School 2015: Charter Rank: #34
 USC School Performance Report 2013: California Charter Rank: #4
 California Standardized Testing Beach City High Schools Average Score Rank: #2

References

External links
 Hawthorne Math and Science Academy official website
 Daily Breeze beach city rankings
 ABC News on U.S. News Rankings
 Daily Breeze on U.S. News Rankings
 U.S. News article on HMSA Ranking
 USC Report on best Charter Schools

High schools in Los Angeles County, California
Charter high schools in California
Hawthorne, California
2003 establishments in California